Handchimes are musical instruments which are rung by hand, similar to handbells. Typically, they are tuned square tubes with an external clapper mechanism.
Many handbell techniques can also be applied to handchimes, though some are more difficult (such as six-in-hand) or impossible (malleting).

Uses
Handchimes were originally intended to be used as a training tool for prospective handbell ringers.  They are cheaper, easier, lighter and more resilient than handbells, making them more accessible for school groups, church youth choirs and senior citizens' groups.

Handchimes are also frequently rung in conjunction with handbells. Certain handbell pieces will involve playing handbells and handchimes at the same time, or alternating between the two through various sections of the music. Handbell ensembles will frequently have a collection of handchimes to use along with their handbells.

Handchimes are also used in classrooms to teach music.

Manufacturers
As of 2018, there are 3 manufacturers of handchimes in the United States:
 Malmark (Choirchimes)
 Schulmerich (bell maker) (MelodyChimes)
 Suzuki (ToneChimes)

References

External links

Idiophones struck directly
Pitched percussion instruments
Hand percussion